Jean-Gilbert Ymbert (6 January 1786 – 9 August 1846) was a  French playwright of the first half of the 19th century.

Master of request at the conseil d'État and conseiller général for the Aisne department, he wrote satirical pieces and vaudevilles. His plays were presented on the most significant Parisian stages of his time including the Théâtre des Variétés, the Théâtre du Gymnase-Dramatique, and the Théâtre de la Porte-Saint-Martin.

His son Théodore Ymbert followed him into legal administration and for a while was also a composer.

Works 

1816: Des Dénonciateurs et des dénonciations, with Antoine-François Varner
1816: L'Art d'obtenir des places, ou la Clef des ministères, ouvrage dédié aux gens sans emploi et aux solliciteurs de toutes les classes
1817: Le Mari sans le savoir, comédie vaudeville in 1 act, with Varner
1817: Le Solliciteur, ou l'Art d'obtenir des places, comedy in 1 act, mingled with vaudevilles, with Eugène Scribe
1818: Éloquence militaire, ou l'Art d'émouvoir le soldat, d'après les plus illustres exemples tirés des armées des différents peuples et principalement d'après les proclamations, harangues, discours et paroles mémorables des généraux et officiers français, par une Société de militaires et d'hommes de lettres
1818: L'Obligeant, ou la Fureur d'être utile, comedy in 1 act, mingled with vaudevilles, with Varner
1820: Le Dîner de garçons, comedy in 1 act, mingled with couplets, with Varner
1820: L'Homme automate, folie-parade mingled with couplets, with Varner
1820: Le Propriétaire sans propriété, comédie-vaudeville in 1 act, with Varner
1820: Trottin, ou le Retour du sérail, folie-vaudeville in 1 act, with Varner
1821: L'Art du ministre, par une ex-Excellence
1822: L'art de faire des dettes et de promener ses créanciers
1822: La Marchande de coco, ou Les projets de réforme, folie-grivoise in 1 act, mingled with couplets, with Varner
1823: Le Faubourien, ou le Philibert de la rue Mouffetard, comédie grivoise in 1 act, mingled with couplets, with Varner
1823: L'Intérieur d'un bureau, ou la Chanson, comédie-vaudeville in 1 act, with Scribe and Varner
1823: Le Précepteur dans l'embarras, comédie-vaudeville in 1 act, with Varner
1824: L'Art de promener ses créanciers, ou Complément de l'Art de faire des dettes, par un homme comme il faut [J.-G. Ymbert], dédié aux gens destitués, réformés, aux victimes des révolutions et des changements de ministères passés, présents et à venir
1825: Mœurs administratives, 2 vols.
1825: Bureaucratie
1825: Le Sous-chef, ou la Famille Gautier, comédie-vaudeville in 1 act
1825: La Ville neutre, ou le Bourgmestre de Neustadt, comédie-vaudeville in 1 act, with Varner
1825: Le Provincial sans emploi, ou les Bureaux de placements, avis aux solliciteurs de toutes les classes et de tous les pays qui se servent du ministère des agents d'affaires
1828: La Nourrice sur lieu, scènes de famille, mingled with couplets, with Armand-François Jouslin de La Salle, Louis Gabriel Montigny and Théodore Nézel
1833: Allocution prononcée par M. Ymbert pour l'inauguration de la statue de Jean Racine à La Ferté-Milon, 29 September 1833
1834: Nouvelle manifestation de l'opinion publique, ou Premiers résultats des réélections dans la garde nationale de Paris
1836: Question d'administration financière... Une main pour recevoir le milliard et une autre main pour le payer, ou faut-il supprimer les payeurs-contrôleurs de département ?
1838: L'An VIII et l'an 1838 ou Causeries familières à la portée de tous les contribuables sur cette question : les conseils généraux de département et d'arrondissement doivent-ils avoir plus de libertés qu'il y a trente-sept ans ? avec examen détaillé du projet de loi présenté à la Chambre des députés sur les attributions des conseils généraux et d'arrondissement

Bibliography 
 Ernest Desplaces, Louis Gabriel Michaud, Biographie universelle, ancienne et moderne, 1843,  
 Ludovic Lalanne, Dictionnaire historique de la France, 1872, 
 Le Conseil d'État, son histoire à travers les documents d'époque, 1799-1974 : catalogue de l'exposition organisée au Palais-Royal 22-28 janvier 1975, à l'occasion de la présentation de l'ouvrage, 1975,

References

External links 
 Jean-Gilbert Ymbert on data.bnf.fr

19th-century French dramatists and playwrights
Writers from Paris
French satirists
1786 births
1846 deaths